Line C is a Rome Metro line which runs from Monte Compatri-Pantano in the eastern suburbs of Rome, in Italy, to San Giovanni near the city centre, where it meets Line A. It is the third metro line to be built in the city and the first to be fully automated.

The first section, between Monte Compatri-Pantano and Parco di Centocelle, opened on 9 November 2014. The second, from Parco di Centocelle to Lodi, opened on 29 June 2015. The third, from Lodi to San Giovanni, opened on 12 May 2018. The line reuses parts of the old Rome-Pantano railway, a light railway that is the last remaining part of the Rome-Fiuggi railway.

Construction

Archeological investigations began in August 2006, before the first construction sites opened in March 2007 on Piazza Roberto Malatesta, to construct Malatesta station. The Lodi station followed one month later.

In May 2008, crews constructed two tunnel boring machines at Giardinetti, and two months later the old Rome-Pantano railway was truncated at Giardinetti to allow restructuring part of the old surface line, which forms a part of the new metro.  This section, from Montecompatri-Pantano to Parco di Centocelle, opened in 2014. The section between Parco di Centocelle to Lodi opened on 29 June 2015, one further station (San Giovanni) opened in May 2018. The section of Line C further west is partly under construction (to Fori Imperiali-Colosseo with one further station in between) and is due to open in 2024. Planning for an additional station at Piazza Venezia is currently in the planning phase and funding has been secured. Project planning for further extensions crossing the city centre (from Venezia to Clodio-Mazzini) was suspended in 2010. A shortened extension to Ottaviano (thus providing a second interchange with Line A) is again under discussion.

In 2009, during preliminary excavations for the station at Piazza Venezia (near the Capitoline Hill) workers found remains of what has been identified as emperor Hadrian's Athenaeum.

Route

Initially, the planned termini were Pantano (a frazione of the comune of Monte Compatri) in the east and Clodio-Mazzini in the north, but in March 2007, a northward extension along the Via Cassia was announced, with nine more stations to Grottarossa. A depot has been built at Graniti. Once construction is complete, the line will cross Line A not only at San Giovanni but also at Ottaviano, and Line B at Colosseo. At Pigneto, a new railway station is currently being constructed on the FL1 line. At the Colosseo stop a public museum was to be constructed in the station to display archaeological material that was excavated during construction, but the project has been scrapped due to the lack of funds.  Instead, a portion of the ruins of the barracks used by the Praetorian Guard will be viewable through a large glass window.

The initial plan featured a station at Largo di Torre Argentina in the city center. However, archaeological remains on the site were even more extensive than expected and the station was cancelled.

Extensions
The following extensions have been studied:
 Northward (towards Rome's rail ring) and the Rome-Viterbo railway, which would be connected to the Metro line at Tor di Quinto; this extension would have five stations and would allow for interchange with the FL5 line at Vigna Clara and Tor di Quinto;
 A southward extension of one station to Tor Vergata, where a secondary depot might be built;
 A northward extension of the east branch from Teano to reach Ponte Mammolo allowing interchange with Line B, with five new stations. This extension would also meet FL2 at Togliatti.

Rolling stock
Line C is served by 30 AnsaldoBreda Driverless Metro convoys.

The metro depot of Line C, the Deposito di Graniti, which extends over 21.7 hectare, is located between the station Graniti and the Eastern terminus Monte Compatri-Pantano.  It additionally serves as the maintenance and control center of Line C.

References

External links

 
 Metro C Spa – the general contractor building the new line

Railway lines opened in 2014
Rome Metro lines
2014 establishments in Italy